Anick Lemay is a Canadian comedienne, actress and restaurateur. A majority of her work is with Quebec television and Quebec cinema.  Her film credits include Sable Island (L'Île de Sable), Cheech, Thrill of the Hills (Frisson des collines), Duo and Kiss Me Like a Lover and the television shows François en série, Toi & Moi and Mauvais Karma.

Lemay was nominated for a Jutra Award in the Best Supporting Actress category for her role in Frisson des collines.

For several years, Lemay was the public spokesperson for Uniprix pharmacy.

In 2014 Lemay opened her own restaurant in Magog, Quebec.

Lemay studied at the Conservatoire de musique et d'art dramatique du Québec.  She considers actress Marie-Thérèse Fortin a mentor.

References

External links

1963 births
Canadian television actresses
Actresses from Quebec
French Quebecers
Living people
People from Thetford Mines
People from Magog, Quebec